George Heriot's School is a Scottish private primary and secondary day school on Lauriston Place in the Old Town of Edinburgh, Scotland. In the early 21st century, it has more than 1600 pupils, 155 teaching staff, and 80 non-teaching staff. It was established in 1628 as George Heriot's Hospital, by bequest of the royal goldsmith George Heriot, and opened in 1659. It is governed by George Heriot's Trust, a Scottish charity.

Architecture

The main building of the school is notable for its renaissance architecture, the work of William Wallace, until his death in 1631. He was succeeded as master mason by William Aytoun, who was succeeded in turn by John Mylne. In 1676, Sir William Bruce drew up plans for the completion of Heriot's Hospital. His design, for the central tower of the north façade, was eventually executed in 1693.

The school is a turreted building surrounding a large quadrangle, and built out of sandstone. The foundation stone is inscribed with the date 1628. The intricate decoration above each window is unique (with one paired exception - those on the ground floor either side of the now redundant central turret on the west side of the building). A statue of the founder can be found in a niche on the north side of the quadrangle.

The main building was the first large building to be constructed outside the Edinburgh city walls. It is located next to Greyfriars Kirk, built in 1620, in open grounds overlooked by Edinburgh Castle directly to the north. Parts of the seventeenth-century city wall (the Telfer Wall) serve as the walls of the school grounds. When built, the building's front facade faced north with access from the Grassmarket by way of Heriot Bridge.  It was originally the only facade fronted in fine ashlar stone, the others being harled rubble. "George Heriot's magnificent pile" became known locally, and by the boys who attended it, as the "Wark".

In 1833 the three rubble facades were refaced in Craigleith ashlar stone. This was done because  the other facades had become more visible when a new entrance was installed on Lauriston Place.  The refacing work was handled by Alexander Black, then Superintendent of Works for the school. He later designed the first Heriot's free schools around the city.

The south gatehouse onto Lauriston Place is by William Henry Playfair and dates from 1829. The chapel interior (1837) is by James Gillespie Graham, who is likely to have been assisted by Augustus Pugin. The school hall was designed by Donald Gow in 1893 and boasts a hammerbeam roof. A mezzanine floor was added later. The science block is by John Chesser (architect) and dates from 1887, incorporating part of the former primary school of 1838 by Alexander Black (architect). The chemistry block to the west of the site was designed by John Anderson in 1911.

The grounds contain a selection of other buildings of varying age; these include a wing by inter-war school specialists Reid & Forbes, and a swimming pool, now unused. A 1922 granite war memorial, by James Dunn, is dedicated to the school's former pupils and teachers who died in World War I. Alumni and teachers who died in World War II were also added to the memorial.

History

17th and 18th centuries 
On his death in 1624, George Heriot left just over 23,625 pounds sterling – equivalent to about £3 million in 2017 – to found a "hospital" (a charitable school) on the model of Christ's Hospital in London, to care for the "puir, faitherless bairns" (Scots: poor, fatherless children) and children of "decayit" (fallen on hard times) burgesses and freemen of Edinburgh.

The construction of Heriot's Hospital (as it was first called) was begun in 1628, just outside the city walls of Edinburgh. It was completed in time to be occupied by Oliver Cromwell's English forces during the invasion of Scotland during the Third English Civil War. When the building was used as a barracks, Cromwell's forces stabled their horses in the chapel. The hospital opened in 1659, with thirty sickly children in residence. As its finances grew, it took in other pupils in addition to the orphans for whom it was intended.

By the end of the 18th century, the Governors of the George Heriot's Trust had purchased the Barony of Broughton, thus acquiring extensive land for feuing (a form of leasehold) on the northern slope below James Craig's Georgian New Town. This and other land purchases beyond the original city boundary generated considerable revenue through leases for the Trust long after Heriot's death.

19th and 20th centuries 
In 1846 there was an insurrection in the Hospital and fifty-two boys were dismissed. This was the worst of several disturbances in the 1840s. Critics of hospital education blamed what they described as the monastic separation of the boys from home life. Only a minority (52 out of 180 in 1844) were fatherless, which meant, these critics argued, that poorer families were leaving their children to Hospital care, even through holiday periods, and the influence of disaffected older boys. 'Auld Callants' (former pupils) were prepared to defend the Hospital as a source of hope and discipline to families in difficulties. This argument about the value of hospitals, which reached the pages of The Times in late 1846, was taken up by Duncan McLaren when he became Lord Provost of Edinburgh, and therefore Chairman of the Hospital Governors, in 1851. McLaren pushed for the number of boys in the Hospital to be reduced and for the Heriot outdoor schools to be expanded with the resources thus saved.

Duncan McLaren was the primary initiator of the 1836 Act that gave the Heriot Governors the power to use the Heriot Trust's surplus to set up "outdoor" (i.e. outside the Hospital) schools. Between 1838 and 1885 the Trust set up and ran 13 juvenile and 8 infant outdoor schools across Edinburgh. At its height in the early 1880s this network of Heriot schools, which did not charge any fees, had a total roll of almost 5,000 pupils. The outdoor Heriot school buildings were sold off or rented out (some to the Edinburgh School Board) when the network was wound up after 1885 as part of reforms to the Trust and the absorption of its outdoor activities by the public school system. Several of these buildings, including the Cowgate, Davie Street, Holyrood and Stockbridge Schools, were designed with architectural features copied from the Lauriston Place Hospital building or stonework elements referring to George Heriot.

George Heriot’s Hospital was at the centre of the controversies surrounding Scottish educational endowments between the late 1860s and the mid 1880s. At a time when general funding for secondary education was not politically possible, reform of these endowments was seen as a way to facilitate access beyond elementary education. The question was, for whom; those who could afford to pay fees or those who could not? 
The Heriot’s controversy was therefore a central issue in Edinburgh municipal politics at this time. In 1875 a Heriot Trust Defence Committee (HTDC) was formed in opposition to the recommendations of the (Colebrooke) Commission on Endowed Schools and Hospitals, set up in 1872. These included making the Hospital a secondary technical day school, using Heriot money to fund university scholarships, introducing fees for the outdoor schools and accepting foundationers from outside Edinburgh. The HTDC saw this as a spoliation of Edinburgh’s poor to the benefit of the middle classes.
Already in 1870, under the permissive Endowed Institutions (Scotland) Act of the previous year, and again in 1879 to the (Moncreiff) Commission on Endowed Institutions in Scotland, and finally in 1883 to the (Balfour) Commission on Educational Endowments, Heriot’s submitted schemes of reform. All were turned down. The reasons included Heriot’s continuing commitment to free and hospital education, and its maintenance of the Heriot outdoor schools after the passage of the Education (Scotland) Act in 1872 brought in publicly supported, compulsory elementary education.
The Balfour Commission had executive powers and used these in 1885 to impose reform on Heriot’s. The Hospital became a day school, charging a modest fee, for boys of 10 and above. Up to 120 foundationers, no younger than 7 years of age, enjoyed preferential admission. Greek was not to be taught. The new George Heriot's Hospital School was, in other words, to be a modern, technically oriented institution. The outdoor school network was to be wound up and the resources used for a variety of scholarships and bursaries, including a number to be used for attendance at the High School and University of Edinburgh. These, rather than the new Heriot's day school, were to provide a path to university education for those able and interested. There were elements in this scheme of a response to contemporary European educational reforms, such as that exemplified by the German Realschulen.

The most uncontroversial aspect of the Balfour Commission’s scheme of 1885 for the reform of the Heriot's Hospital and Trust was the takeover of the "Watt Institution and School of Arts" by the Trust. This was to be renamed the Heriot-Watt College. This was not just a matter of the Trust providing financial support, but was part of a policy of encouraging technical education in Edinburgh. Provision was especially to be made for pupils to continue their studies after completing the higher classes of the new Heriot’s day school. The School and the College were both run under the Heriot board of governors until the development and financial needs of the College required a separation in 1927. The Trust continued to make a contribution to the College of £8,000 p.a. thereafter. In 1966 the College was granted university status as Heriot-Watt University.

In 1979 Heriot's became co-educational after admitting girls. In the same year Lothian Regional Council attempted to bring the school in to the local authority system, but the Secretary of State for Scotland intervened.

Modern era 
In the early 21st century, George Heriot's has approximately 1600 pupils. It continues to serve its charitable goal by providing free education to children who are bereaved of a parent, such children being referred to as "foundationers". In 2012, the school was ranked as Edinburgh's best performing school by Higher exam results.

Headmasters and principals

Chronological list of the headmasters of the school, the year given being the one in which they took office.

1659 James Lawson
1664 David Davidsone
1669 David Browne
1670 William Smeaton
1673 Harry Moresone
1699 James Buchan
1702 John Watson
1720 David Chrystie
1734 William Matheson
1735 John Hunter
1741 William Halieburton
1741 John Henderson
1757 James Colvill
1769 George Watson
1773 William Hay
1782 Thomas Thomson
1792 David Cruikshank
1794 James Maxwell Cockburn
1795 George Irvine
1805 John Somerville
1816 John Christison
1825 James Boyd
1829 Hector Holme
1839 William Steven
1844 James Fairburn
1854 Frederick W. Bedford
1880 David Fowler Lowe
1908 John Brown Clark
1926 William Gentle 
1942 William Carnon
1947 William Dewar
1970 Allan McDonald
1983 Keith Pearson
1997 Alistair Hector

Thereafter, the title of Headmaster was changed to that of Principal.

2014 (January) Gareth Doodes
2014 (September) Cameron Wyllie (Acting) 
2014 (December) Cameron Wyllie
2018 (January) Mrs Lesley Franklin
2021 (August) Gareth Warren

Other notable staff
James Craik, Classics, c.1822 to c.1832
John Watt Butters, Maths, 1888 to 1899
James Stagg, Science, 1921 to 1923
 Donald Hastie, Games, 1949 to 1979 Hastie was reportedly the first full-time games master in Scotland.
Ray Milne, French and German, 1974 to 1978
Sam Mort, English and Drama (1997 to 2001), in 2021 Unicef chief of Communication, Advocacy and Civic Engagement in Afghanistan

Sports and extra-curricular activities
Former pupils' clubs, the Heriot's Rugby Club and Heriot's Cricket Club, carry the School's name and use the School's Goldenacre grounds. George Heriot's School Rowing Club competes at a national level and is affiliated to Scottish Rowing. There is a pipe band, and around 120 pupils take tuition of some kind.

Notable alumni

Academia and Science
 George Alexander Carse (1880 – 1950) - physicist (dux in 1898)
 J. W. S. Cassels, FRS (1922 – 2015) -  mathematician
Henry Daniels, FRS (1912 – 2000) - statistician
 Robin Ferrier (1932 – 2013) - organic chemist
 Sir George Taylor (botanist) (1904 - 1993) 
 Sir Thomas Dalling (1892 - 1982) - Professor of Animal Pathology at Cambridge and Chief Veterinary Officer to the United Kingdom
 John Borthwick Gilchrist (1759 – 1841) - Indologist
 Professor Sir Abraham Goldberg (1923 – 2007), KB MD DSc FRCP FRSE  - Emeritus Regius Professor of Medicine, University of Glasgow
 Professor Hyman Levy (1889 – 1975), FRSE - Scottish philosopher, mathematician, political activist 
 Sir Harry (Work) Melville (1908 – 2000), FRSE - polymer chemist and administrator
 Professor Hamish Scott FBA FRSE (b. 1946) - historian
 Professor Gordon Turnbull (b. ) - psychiatrist
 Professor Douglas C. Heggie (b. 1947), FRSE - Personal Chair of Mathematical Astronomy, School of Mathematics, University of Edinburgh

Media and Arts
 Nick Abbot (b. 1960) - Talk Radio presenter
 Ian Bairnson (b. 1953) - musician, member of Pilot and The Alan Parsons Project
 Emun Elliott (b. 1983) - actor
 Gavin Esler (b. 1953) - television journalist and presenter of Newsnight
 Mark Goodier (b. 1961) - Radio One disc jockey
 Mike Heron (b. 1942) - musician, formerly of the Incredible String Band
 Roy Kinnear (1934 – 1988) - actor
 Duncan Hendry (1951 - 2003) - Chief Executive of Aberdeen Performing Arts and of Edinburgh's Capital Theatres
 Iain Macwhirter (b. 1953) - journalist and Rector of the University of Edinburgh (2009 – 2012)
 Henry Raeburn (1756 – 1823) -  painter
 Ian Richardson (1934 – 2007) - actor
 Mike Scott (musician) (b. 1958) - musician and composer, founder of The Waterboys
 Alastair Sim (1900 – 1976) - actor
 Ken Stott (b. 1955) - actor
 Bryan Swanson (b. 1980) - Sky Sports chief reporter
 Nigel Tranter (1909 – 2000) - historical novelist
 Robert Urquhart (1921 – 1995) - actor
 Charlotte Wells - film director
 Paul Young (actor) (b. 1944) - actor

Law and Politics
 Tasmina Ahmed-Sheikh (b. 1970) - SNP politician
 James Mackay, Baron Mackay of Clashfern (b. 1927) - Advocate and former Lord Chancellor
 David McLetchie (1952 – 2013) - former leader of the Scottish Conservatives
 Doug Naysmith (b. 1941) - Labour politician and former MP for Bristol North West
 Keith Stewart, Baron Stewart of Dirleton - HM Advocate General for Scotland
 Gordon Prentice (b. 1951) - Labour politician and former MP for Pendle
 Stephen Woolman, Lord Woolman (b. 1953) - Senator of the College of Justice
 Kenneth Borthwick CBE DL JP (1915 – 2017) - Lord Provost of Edinburgh (1977 to 1980), Chairman of the 1986 Commonwealth Games
 Sir Adam Wilson (1814 – 1891) - 15th mayor of Toronto, member of the Legislative Assembly of the Province of Canada

Sports
 Bruce Douglas (b. 1980) - Rugby Union player
 Charles Groves (1896–1969) - cricketer
 Andy Irvine (b. 1951) - Rugby Union internationalist
 Iain Milne (b. 1956) - Rugby Union player
 Kenny Milne (b. 1961) - Rugby Union player
 Robert More (b. 1980) - cricketer
 John Mushet (1875–1965) - cricketer
 Gordon Ross (b. 1978) - Rugby Union player
 Ken Scotland (b. 1936) - Rugby Union internationalist
 Polly Swann (b. 1988) - Member of the GB Rowing Team, and Rowing World Champion
 Douglas Walker (b. 1973) - sprinter

Military
 Colonel Clive Fairweather (1944 – 2012) - 2nd in command of the SAS during the Iranian Embassy siege.
 David Stuart McGregor (1895 – 1918) - Scottish recipient of the Victoria Cross

Religion
 Graham Forbes, CBE (b. 1951) - Provost of St Mary's Cathedral, Edinburgh
 Hector Bransby Gooderham (1901 – 1977) - priest of the Scottish Episcopal Church
 Gordon Keddie (b. 1944) - Reformed Presbyterian minister and theologian
 James Pitt-Watson (1893–1962) - theologian and Moderator of the General Assembly of the Church of Scotland
 Brian Smith (bishop) (b. 1943) - Bishop of Edinburgh (Scottish Episcopal Church) 2001–2011

Other
 James Aitken, aka "John the Painter" (1752 – 1777) - mercenary
 Hippolyte Blanc (1844 – 1917) - architect
 Archie Forbes (1913 – 1999), CBE  -  Colonial administrator
 Norman Irons (b.  ) - former Lord Provost of Edinburgh
 Sir Andrew Hunter Arbuthnot Murray (1903 – 1977) - former Lord Provost of Edinburgh
 Stuart Harris (1920 – 1997), architect and local historian

References

External links

 
 Profile on the Independent Schools Council website

Buildings and structures completed in 1628
School buildings completed in the 17th century
Renaissance architecture in Scotland
Category A listed buildings in Edinburgh
Educational institutions established in the 1650s
Member schools of the Headmasters' and Headmistresses' Conference
Old Town, Edinburgh
Private schools in Edinburgh
William Bruce buildings
William Wallace buildings
1628 establishments in Scotland